Bandiana was a closed station located in the town of Bandiana, on the Cudgewa railway line in Victoria, Australia. Today there is nothing left of the station.

Disused railway stations in Victoria (Australia)